Princess Margaret Hospital for Children (PMH) is a former children's hospital and centre for paediatric research and care located in Perth, Western Australia. It was the state's only specialist children's hospital until it closed in 2018, coinciding with the opening of the new Perth Children's Hospital that was built to replace it. Together with the Child and Adolescent Community Health Division, it made up the Child and Adolescent Health Service. 

Formerly located on Roberts Road in Subiaco, Western Australia, the hospital had approximately 220 beds and served 300,000 patients per year.

History

PMH originated as the Perth Children's Hospital in 1909 after 12 years of community fundraising. The original facilities included 40 beds, an operating theatre and outpatient department. The name Princess Margaret Hospital for Children was adopted in 1949, in honour of Princess Margaret, sister of Queen Elizabeth II.

In 1994 the organisational structure for the Princess Margaret Hospital for Children and King Edward Memorial Hospital's merged (but not their locations). In 2002 that organisation was renamed Women's and Children's Health Service. In 2006, the two hospitals were once again separated.

In 2008, the state government announced that a new children's hospital would be built to replace Princess Margaret Hospital for Children. Following the completion of the new Perth Children's Hospital in May 2018, and the opening of its emergency department, Princess Margaret Hospital closed its doors on 10 June 2018, and all patients were transferred to the new hospital.

In March 2021 major demolition works began at the former hospital site; however two heritage-listed buildings, Godfrey House and the Old Outpatients Building were preserved as well as the hospital's boiler house and chimney stack. The demolition works were completed in October 2022. The cleared site will then become part of the ongoing Subi East redevelopment.

See also

 List of hospitals in Western Australia
 Health care in Australia

References

External links
 
 

Children's hospitals in Australia
Former hospitals in Perth, Western Australia
Hospitals established in 1909
Hospitals disestablished in 2018
Hospital buildings completed in 1909
Subiaco, Western Australia
Teaching hospitals in Australia
1909 establishments in Australia